Bill Badger and the Pirates is a children's novel with a canal-side setting, written and illustrated in 1960 by the prolific author Denys Watkins-Pitchford, who wrote under the pseudonym "BB".

The plot revolves around the release from prison of Bill Badger's sworn enemy, the cat Napoleon, and his attempt to capture Bill's barge, Wandering Wind. The novel blends a stirring story with deeper moral issues.

Bill Badger and the Pirates is the third in the Bill Badger series, which ran to eight books over a decade from the first in 1957 (Wandering Wind, reprinted as Bill Badger and the Wandering Wind). The final in the series was Bill Badger and the Voyage to the World's End of 1969

Footnotes

1960 British novels
British children's novels
Novels about pirates
Works published under a pseudonym
Children's novels about animals
Hamish Hamilton books
1960 children's books
British children's books
Novels about cats